Julian Clarkson (born c. 1955) is an English baritone. He is best known for his work with the Monteverdi Choir, singing Bach cantatas. Among his recordings are Weinen, Klagen, Sorgen, Zagen, BWV 12, Ihr werdet weinen und heulen, BWV 103, and Wir müssen durch viel Trübsal, BWV 146. He has also performed with La Chapelle Royale, Les Musiciens du Louvre, the Orchestra of the Age of Enlightenment, Florilegium and has toured with the Amsterdam Baroque Orchestra.

References

External links
Profile at Monteverdi.co.uk

English operatic baritones
Living people
Place of birth missing (living people)
Date of birth missing (living people)
Alumni of St John's College, Cambridge
Year of birth missing (living people)